Ion Pervilhac (born 28 May 1947) is a French luger. He competed in the men's singles and doubles events at the 1968 Winter Olympics.

References

1947 births
Living people
French male lugers
Olympic lugers of France
Lugers at the 1968 Winter Olympics
Sportspeople from New York City